was a railway station on the Sanriku Railway Company’s Rias Line located in the city of Ōfunato, Iwate Prefecture, Japan. It is 12.0 rail kilometers from the terminus of the line at Sakari Station.

Station layout 
Koishihama Station has a single elevated side platform serving a single bi-directional track. There is no station building, but only a shelter on the platform. The station is unattended.

History 
Koishihama Station opened on 16 October 1985 using the kanji . The name was changed to its present form on 20 July 2009. During the 11 March 2011 Tōhoku earthquake and tsunami, part of the tracks on the Minami-Rias Line were swept away, thus suspending services. The line resumed operations on 3 April 2013 between Sakari and Yoshihama. Services between Yoshihama and Kamaishi resumed on 5 April 2014. Minami-Rias Line, a portion of Yamada Line, and Kita-Rias Line constitute Rias Line in 23 March 2019. Accordingly, this station became an intermediate station of Rias Line.

Adjacent stations

Surrounding area 
Koishihama Fishing Port

See also
 List of railway stations in Japan

References

External links

  

Railway stations in Iwate Prefecture
Railway stations in Japan opened in 1985
Ōfunato, Iwate